There is a variety of places in Leatherhead, Surrey which are used for leisure and entertainment:

Clubs and activities
 Bocketts Farm
 Cannons Health Club
 Leatherhead Army Cadet Force
 Leatherhead & Cobham Cricket Club
 Leatherhead F.C.
 Leatherhead Golf Club
 Leatherhead Leisure Centre
 Leatherhead Museum
 Odeon Cinemas (In Epsom)
 Miniature Railway Club
 Leatherhead Theatre (Formerly the Thorndike Theatre)
 Tyrrells Wood Golf Club
 Stoke d'Abernon Cricket Club

Pubs
 Duke's Head 
 The Edmund Tilney
 The Penny Black
 The Plough
 The Royal Oak
 The Running Horse
 The Star (Surrey/Greater London County line runs through the bar.)

Social clubs
 Constitutional Club (Former Conservative Club)
 Leatherhead and District Social Club, C&IU Affiliate.
 Leatherhead Royal British Legion Club, C&IU Affiliate.
 North Leatherhead Community Association (NLCA)

Hotels
 Travelodge, in Leatherhead and Dorking
 Swan Lodge B&B
 Burford Bridge Hotel, historic hotel in Mickleham, where Lord Nelson spent his last hours with his love Emma Hamilton, before the Battle of Trafalgar
 Woodlands Park Hotel

Tourist attractions in Surrey
Leatherhead